Maskali is a rural locality (a village) in Kosinskoye Rural Settlement, Kosinsky District, Perm Krai, Russia. The population was 116 as of 2010. There are 3 streets.

Geography 
Maskali is located 20 km north of Kosa (the district's administrative centre) by road. Mys is the nearest rural locality.

References 

Rural localities in Kosinsky District